Macdonaldtown railway station is located on the Main Suburban line, serving the Sydney suburb of Eveleigh. It is served by Sydney Trains T2 Inner West & Leppington line services.

History
The original Macdonaldtown station opened in 1878 at a site adjacent to the Charles Street subway. It was relocated to its present site on 3 April 1892.

The Main Suburban line through Macdonaldtown was quadruplicated in 1892, and sextuplicated in 1927 in association with electrification works.

An island platform on the middle pair of tracks was taken out of use and demolished in November 1985. The closed access stairs to this may still be seen from the underpass entrance. To the south of the station, lie the Macdonaldtown Stabling Yards. A footbridge that spanned all six lines was removed in June 1996.

On the morning of 13 July 1986 Macdonaldtown station was painted pink by then 18 year-old John Philip Baxter and his 14-year-old brother. Baxter also glued a table, two chairs and a pot-plant (also painted pink) to the platform to further his "overall effort to enhance the station". No conviction was recorded and the State Rail Authority's claim for damages was rejected by the magistrate.

Platforms & services

References

External links

Macdonaldtown station details Transport for New South Wales

Railway stations in Sydney
Railway stations in Australia opened in 1878
Main Suburban railway line